The Bluff is a rural locality in the City of Ipswich, Queensland, Australia.

References

City of Ipswich
Localities in Queensland